Suggs is a surname. Notable people with the surname include:

A. J. Suggs (born 1980), American collegiate football player
Brad Suggs (born 1933), American singer songwriter
Colby Suggs (born 1991), American baseball player and coach
Don Suggs (born 1945), American artist
Eliza Suggs (1876–1908), 19th-century American author
George Suggs (1882–1949), American baseball player
Jalen Suggs (born 2001), American basketball player
Josh Suggs (born 1989), American soccer player
Lee Suggs (born 1980), American football player
Louise Suggs (1923–2015), female American golfer
Marvin Suggs, character on the Muppets
Matt Suggs, American indie rock musician
Shafer Suggs (born 1953), American football player
Terrell Suggs (born 1982), American football player
Ralph E. Suggs (born 1947), retired US Navy Rear Admiral
Robert Carl Suggs (born 1932), American archaeologist
Walter Suggs (born 1939), retired American football player
Welch Suggs, American sportswriter

See also
Sugg, surname